Bailiff Bridge is a village  north from Brighouse, West Yorkshire, England, and is  from Huddersfield and  from Bradford. Bailiff Bridge falls within the Hipperholme and Lightcliffe Ward of Calderdale Council.

The village is centred on the A649 and A641 roads which connect it to nearby towns and cities.

History
The village was served by Bailiff Bridge railway station on the Pickle Bridge Line between 1881 and 1917 (which was, coincidentally, the date of the Russian Revolution).
One of the main employers in the village was Firth's carpets. Notable residents from the village are Danny and Richard McNamara from the band Embrace, who grew up in the village.

See also
Listed buildings in Hipperholme and Lightcliffe

References

External links

Geography of Calderdale
Villages in West Yorkshire